Franklin Starbuck Sullivan (February 7, 1896 – September 30, 1972) was an American film editor.

Biography
 
Born in St. Paul, Minnesota, Sullivan was the younger brother of C. Gardner Sullivan, a Hollywood screenwriter. He worked as an editor on such films as Fury (1936), Babes in Arms (1939), The Philadelphia Story (1940), and Woman of the Year (1942). He received an Academy Award nomination in 1948 for his work on Joan of Arc.

Sullivan was married to Doris Sullivan with whom he had two children. He died on September 30, 1972 Woodland Hills, Los Angeles at the age of 76. He is buried at Forest Lawn Memorial Park, Hollywood Hills.

Partial filmography
Torrent (1926)
West Point (1927)
Detectives (1928)
The Unholy Three (1930)
New Adventures of Get Rich Quick Wallingford (1931)
Mata Hari (1931)
The Gay Bride (1934)
Fury (1936)
The Last of Mrs. Cheyney (1937)
Babes in Arms (1939)
The Philadelphia Story (1940)
Woman of the Year (1942)
Thirty Seconds Over Tokyo (1944)
Adventure (1945)
Joan of Arc (1948)
Teresa (1951)
 The Go-Getter (1956)

External links

1896 births
1972 deaths
Burials at Forest Lawn Memorial Park (Hollywood Hills)
People from Saint Paul, Minnesota
American film editors